Tryfon Kazviropoulos (born 21 September 1996) is a Greek professional footballer who plays as a left winger for Football League club Thesprotos.

Honours
AEK Athens
Football League 2: 2013–14 (6th Group)

External links
 http://www.acemanagement.gr/el/players/kazviropoulos-tryfon/
 http://www.football-academies.gr/scoutmagazine/7477-hellas-verona-kazviropoulos-aek.html
 http://www.calciatori.com/calciatore/kazviropoulos-tryfon

1994 births
Living people
AEK Athens F.C. players
Panegialios F.C. players
Association football defenders
Acharnaikos F.C. players
A.E. Sparta P.A.E. players
Footballers from Athens
Greek footballers